"Mixed Bizness" is a song by American musician Beck. It was released as the second single from his 1999 album Midnite Vultures. Released in 2000, the CD single included five non-album tracks/remixes. It peaked at number 34 in the UK Singles Chart. The song was featured in an episode of Malcolm in the Middle and American Dad. The primary drum beat heard throughout the track is a sample from “Honky Tonk Women” by The Rolling Stones.

Background
Some of the song's lyrics had been ad-libed by Beck in concert before the song's release. For an example, on January 3, 1998, during the beginning of a  performance of "Where It's At", Beck shouted "I'm talking about mixing business!".

In contrast to most other music, the lyrics in the song are more about the very feminine side of sexuality, with lyrics like "I'll be your mistress", "make all the lesbians scream," and "I'll comb your hair, rewrite your diary" showcasing this.

Live history
The song has been performed over 300 times by Beck. It has been performed fairly regularly since its release, with the exception of 2010 to 2014, when Beck only played it once in 2011.

Beck performed the song 54 times on his Colors tour.

Track listings

United States
CD
"Mixed Bizness"
"Mixed Bizness" (Nu Wave Dreamix by Les Rythmes Digitales)
"Mixed Bizness" (Cornelius remix)
"Mixed Bizness" (DJ Me DJ You remix)
"Dirty Dirty"
"Saxx Laws (Night Flight to Ojai)"

12"
"Mixed Bizness"
"Mixed Bizness" (Nu Wave Dreamix by Les Rythmes Digitales)
"Mixed Bizness" (Dirty Bixin Mixness Remix by Bix Pender)
"Mixed Bizness" (Cornelius remix)
"Dirty Dirty"

United Kingdom
CD1
 "Mixed Bizness" – 3:48
 "Mixed Bizness" (Cornelius Remix) – 4:48
 "Mixed Bizness" (DJ Me DJ You remix) – 3:58
 "Mixed Bizness" (CD-ROM video, directed by Stéphane Sednaoui)

CD2
 "Mixed Bizness" (Nu Wave Dreamix by Les Rythmes Digitales) – 4:22
 "Dirty Dirty" – 4:41
 "Sexx Laws" (CD-ROM video)

7"
 "Mixed Bizness"
 "Mixed Bizness" (Dirty Bixin Mixness Remix by Bix Pender)

CD maxi-single
"Mixed Bizness"
"Mixed Bizness" (Nu Wave Dreamix by Les Rythmes Digitales)
"Mixed Bizness" (Dirty Bixin Mixness Remix by Bix Pender)
"Arabian Nights"

EU
CD single
"Mixed Bizness"
"Arabian Nights"

Japan
CD
"Mixed Bizness"
"Mixed Bizness" (Cornelius Remix)
"Mixed Bizness" (Nu Wave Dreamix by Les Rythmes Digitales)
"Mixed Bizness" (DJ Me DJ You remix)
"Mixed Bizness" (Dirty Bixin Mixness Remix by Bix Pender)
"Dirty Dirty"
"Saxx Laws" (Night Flight to Ojai)

Personnel
Beck – lead vocals, vocoder, horn arrangement
Justin Meldal-Johnsen – bass, backing vocals, shaker
Roger Joseph Manning Jr. – synthesizer, vocoder, backing vocals
Smokey Hormel – guitar
Joey Waronker – drums
David Arthur Brown – tenor sax
Jon Birdsong – trumpet
David Ralicke – trombone
Tony Hoffer – guitar

Chart positions

External links

References

Beck songs
1999 songs
2000 singles
Music videos directed by Stéphane Sednaoui
Songs written by Beck
Geffen Records singles
LGBT-related songs